Southern Punjab cricket team is a
− first-class cricket team in Pakistan. The team with five other new teams was introduced as a part of new domestic structure by
− Pakistan Cricket Board (PCB) on 31 August 2019.

2019 squads
On 3 September 2019, PCB confirmed team's First XI and Second XI squads for the 2019–21 season. Pakistan's Test opener Shan Masood was announced as captain of the team's First XI, while Naved Yasin was named as Second XI's captain for the season.

First XI

 Shan Masood (c)
 Sami Aslam (vc)
 Mohammad Abbas
 Abdul Rehman Muzammil 
 Adnan Akmal  (wk)
 Aamer Yamin 
 Bilawal Bhatti 
 Imran Rafiq 
 Mohammad Irfan 
 Mohammad Irfan 
 Mohammad Hafeez 
 Rahat Ali 
 Saif Badar  
 Sohaib Maqsood 
 Umaid Asif 
 Umar Siddiq 
 Zahid Mahmood 
 Zain Abbas
 Ali Khan
 Shoaib Malik
 Sadaif Mehdi

Second XI

 Naved Yasin (c) 
 Salman Ali Agha (vc) 
 Ali Usman
 Anas Mustafa
 Ataullah
 Maqbool Ahmed (wk)
 Mohammad Ali Khan
 Mohammad Basit
 Mohammad Imran
 Mohammad Irfan Jr
 Mohammad Mohsin 
 Mohammad Umair
 Mukhtar Ahmed
 Zeeshan Ashraf
 Zia-ul-Haq
 Zulfiqar Babar (mentor)

2020 squads
 Shan Masood (c)
 Hussain Talat (vc)
 Aamer Yamin
 Ali Shafiq 
 Bilawal Bhatti
 Khushdil Shah
 Mohammad Abbas
 Mohammad Ilyas
 Mohammad Irfan 
 Rahat Ali
 Saif Badar
 Sohaib Maqsood
 Umer Khan
 Umar Siddiq
 Zahid Mahmood
 Zeeshan Ashraf (wk)

References

Southern Punjab (Pakistan) cricketers